Striarcana is a genus of sea snails, marine gastropod mollusks in the family Pyramidellidae, the pyrams and their allies.

Species
Species within the genus Striarcana include:
 Striarcana cryptolira Laws, 1937
 Striarcana tauranga Laws, 1937

References

 Howson, C.M.; Picton, B.E. (Ed.) (1997). The species directory of the marine fauna and flora of the British Isles and surrounding seas. Ulster Museum Publication, 276. The Ulster Museum: Belfast, UK. . vi, 508 (+ cd-rom)

External links
 To World Register of Marine Species

Pyramidellidae
Gastropod genera